United Services Portsmouth F.C. are a football club based in Portsmouth, Hampshire, England. They were established in 1962 as Portsmouth Royal Navy and were among the founding members of the Wessex League in 1986. In 2004, they changed their name to their present one. Mason Mount also featured for the side.

History
Portsmouth Royal Navy FC was formed in 1962 by Dennis Probee with the intention of providing competitive football at the highest level possible to bridge the gap between the United Services mid week Leagues and the Royal Navy and Combined Services Representative Sides.

Portsmouth Royal Navy FC played in the Hampshire League from its formation until the 1985–86 season when the club became one of the seventeen founder members of the Wessex League. They stayed in the Wessex league until the 2001–02 season. This prompted changes in the infrastructure of Portsmouth Royal Navy FC and the change of name to United Services Portsmouth FC in 2004. The change of name also marked the opening up of the side to players from all of the armed services as well as civilians. The club remained in Division One until 2021, when they were promoted to the Premier Division based on their results in the abandoned 2019–20 and 2020–21 seasons.

Ground

United Services Portsmouth play their home games at Victory Stadium, Burnaby Road, Portsmouth, PO1 2EJ.

The Victory Ground has gradually developed and now has a 500 seated covered stand, two floodlit Hockey  Astroturf pitches, electronic scoreboard and a clubhouse. Changing facilities were constructed under the main stand during the 1995–96 season.

Honours
Hampshire League Division Two:
Winners: 1967–68, 1977–78 1980–81
Russell Cotes Cup
Winners: 1967–68
Portsmouth Senior Cup 
Winners: 2011–12

Records
Highest League Position:
3rd in Wessex league division one: 2008–09
FA CUP Best Performance
Second Qualifying Round: 1997–98, 1998–99
FA Vase Best Performance
Semi-finals: 2020–21

References

External links
Official club website
Youth website

Football clubs in Hampshire
Wessex Football League
Association football clubs established in 1962
Football clubs in England
1962 establishments in England
Sport in Portsmouth
Portsmouth